Patricia Earlene "Pat" McElraft (born March 20, 1947) is a former Republican member of the North Carolina House of Representatives. She represented the 13th district (including all of Carteret and Jones counties) from 2007 to 2023. She is currently one of the Deputy Majority Whips. McElraft announced in December 2021 that she would not run for reelection in 2022.

McElraft and her husband, retired Colonel Roger McElraft, live in Emerald Isle, North Carolina and have two grown children. She was a technical sales representative for Microbiology Product Company. Previously, she served 3 terms as an Emerald Isle Town Commissioner and a partial term as Carteret County Commissioner before being elected to the State House.

Political positions
During the 2011-2012 session, McElraft was chairman of the Environment committee and Vice-Chairman of the Insurance committee. McElraft drafted House Bill 819 (S.L. 2012-201), which prevented local and state agencies from incorporating recent scientific estimates of projected sea level rise due to climate change in planning efforts, making it easier to expand development in low coastal areas.

Electoral history

2020

2018

2016

2014

2012
In 2012, McElraft did not face any primary opponents. She faced a rematch with Wyatt Rike (now a Libertarian candidate) in the general election. McElraft easily won re-election with nearly 90% of the vote.

2010
In 2010, McElraft faced a primary challenge from Morehead City resident Wyatt Rike. She defeated Rike 77%–22% and went on to defeat the Democratic candidate, environmental scientist and teacher Craig Hassler (also of Morehead City), with 73% of the vote.

2008
In 2008, McElraft did not face any primary opponents, continuing on to the general election to face the Democratic party candidate Barbara Garrity-Blake. Garrity-Blake, a doctorate anthropologist from Down East and former commissioner on the North Carolina Marine Fisheries Commission, also did not face any primary challenge. McElraft defeated Garrity-Blake 57%–43%.

2006
After serving several years as both a town and county commissioner, McElraft ran, in 2006, for the North Carolina House of Representatives district 13 seat held by Jean R. Preston who decided to run for state Senate. McElraft defeated Dave Fowler in the Republican primary 68%–32%. In the general election, McElraft faced Democratic veteran politician Malcolm Fulcher who had previously served in the state House in the late 1970s to early 1980s. McElraft won the seat 58%–42%.

Committee assignments

2021-2022 session
Appropriations (Vice Chair)
Appropriations - Agriculture and Natural and Economic Resources (Chair)
Environment (Chair)
Health 
Insurance 
Judiciary I 
Regulatory Reform

2019-2020 session
Appropriations (Vice Chair)
Appropriations - Agriculture and Natural and Economic Resources (Chair)
Environment (Chair)
Insurance 
Regulatory Reform 
State and Local Government

2017-2018 session
Appropriations (Vice Chair)
Appropriations - Agriculture and Natural and Economic Resources (Chair)
Environment (Chair)
Insurance
Regulatory Reform
State Personnel
Ethics
Health Care Reform

2015-2016 session
Appropriations (Vice Chair)
Appropriations - Agriculture and Natural and Economic Resources
Appropriations - Information Technology
Commerce and Job Development
Environment (Chair)
Insurance
Regulatory Reform
State Personnel
Ethics

2013-2014 session
Appropriations (Vice Chair)
Environment (Chair)
Insurance (Vice Chair)
Regulatory Reform
Transportation

2011-2012 session
Appropriations
Environment (Chair)
Insurance (Vice Chair)
Education
Transportation

2009-2010 session
Appropriations
Environment and Natural Resources
Local Government II
Education
Juvenile Justice
Marine Resources and Aquaculture

References

External links

North Carolina General Assembly page
 

Living people
1947 births
People from Hugo, Oklahoma
People from Emerald Isle, North Carolina
21st-century American politicians
21st-century American women politicians
Women state legislators in North Carolina
County commissioners in North Carolina
Republican Party members of the North Carolina House of Representatives